David Elazzar Kaplan is a theoretical particle physicist at the Johns Hopkins University.

Biography
David E. Kaplan received his Bachelor of Science from the University of California at Berkeley in 1991, his Master's in Physics from the University of Washington in 1996 and PhD from the same institute under supervision of Ann Nelson in 1999. After postdoctoral positions at the University of Chicago, Argonne National Lab and in the SLAC Theory Group, he joined the faculty at Johns Hopkins in 2002.

His primary research interest is physics beyond the standard model, with a particular focus on the Higgs mechanism and potentially related physics such as supersymmetry, new  forces, extra dimensions, and dark matter. He is also exploring connections between high energy physics and cosmology. He was selected as a Kavli Frontiers Fellow of the National Academy of Sciences, and an Alfred P. Sloan Fellow.

In 2011, Kaplan co-hosted season three of National Geographic Channel's Known Universe documentary series along with Sigrid Close, Andy Howell, Michael J. Massimino, and Steve Jacobs. Kaplan also produced (and starred in) the documentary Particle Fever.

Honors and awards
2018 Andrew Gemant Award of the American Institute of Physics

Notes

References

External links
 Faculty directory page at the Johns Hopkins University

21st-century American physicists
Year of birth missing (living people)
Johns Hopkins University faculty
Living people
Particle physicists
Place of birth missing (living people)
Fellows of the American Physical Society